Group C of the EuroBasket Women 2015 took place between 11 and 15 June 2015. The group played all of its games at Arena Savaria in Szombathely, Hungary.

The group composed of Croatia, Great Britain, Latvia, Russia and Serbia. The three best ranked teams advanced to the second round.

Standings

All times are local (UTC+2).

11 June

Latvia vs Serbia

Russia vs Croatia

12 June

Croatia vs Latvia

Great Britain vs Russia

13 June

Latvia vs Great Britain

Serbia vs Croatia

14 June

Great Britain vs Serbia

Russia vs Latvia

15 June

Croatia vs Great Britain

Serbia vs Russia

External links
Official website

Group C
2014–15 in Russian basketball
2014–15 in Serbian basketball
2014–15 in Croatian basketball
2014–15 in Latvian basketball
2014–15 in British basketball